In Greek mythology Adrastus or Adrestus (Ancient Greek: Ἄδραστος or Ἄδρηστος), (perhaps meaning "the inescapable"), usually refers to:
 Adrastus, the son of Talaus, king of Argos, and leader of the Seven against Thebes.

Other figures in Greek mythology also named Adrastus include:

 Adrastus, son of Polynices and Argia, who was the daughter of King Adrastus of Argos, making this Adrastus the grandson of his namesake. He was a leader of the Mycenaeans during the Trojan War and was also counted as one of the Epigoni.
 Adrastus, father of Eurydice, the wife of King Ilus of Troy.
 Adrastus, a son of King Merops of Percote, and brother to Amphius. Along with Amphius, he led a military force from Adrastea, Apaesus, Pityeia and Tereia to the Trojan War, as allies of Troy (despite the entreaties of their father, a seer, who could foresee that death awaited them on the battlefield). He, and his brother Amphius were killed by Diomedes. Possibly the same as the Adrastus who was captured by Menelaus, and killed by Agamemnon (see below).
 Adrastus, a warrior at Troy captured by Menelaus, to whom he pleaded for his life, saying that his father was rich and would pay a large ransom for his return. Menelaus was about to have him taken prisoner when Agamemnon objected and killed him. Possibly the same as the son of King Merops of Percote (see above).
 Adrastus a warrior fighting on the side of Troy, during the Trojan War, killed by Patroclus.
 Adrastus, a Phrygian, who was the son of Gordias the son of Midas, and fled Phrigia after he accidentally killed his brother, seeking refuge at the court of Croesus in Lydia.
 Adrastus, father of Hippodamia who married Peirithous but the Centaurs attempted to carry her off.
 Adrastus, a Phrygian king who was said to have built the first temple of Nemesis, and after whom Adrasteia, a city and plain in the Troad, was said to have been named. Sometimes confused with Adrastus, the son of Talaus, king of Argos, and leader of the Seven against Thebes (see above). This Adrastus may be the same as the father of Eurydice, wife of Ilus (above).

Notes

References 
 Apollodorus, Apollodorus, The Library, with an English Translation by Sir James George Frazer, F.B.A., F.R.S. in 2 Volumes. Cambridge, Massachusetts, Harvard University Press; London, William Heinemann Ltd. 1921. Online version at the Perseus Digital Library.
 Diodorus Siculus, Diodorus Siculus: The Library of History. Translated by C. H. Oldfather. Twelve volumes. Loeb Classical Library. Cambridge, Massachusetts: Harvard University Press; London: William Heinemann, Ltd. 1989. Online version by Bill Thayer.
 Euripides, Iphigenia in Aulis, translated by E. P. Coleridge, in The Plays of Euripides, translated by E. P. Coleridge. Volume II. London. George Bell and Sons. 1891. Online version at the Perseus Digital Library.
 Gaius Julius Hyginus, Fabulae from The Myths of Hyginus translated and edited by Mary Grant. University of Kansas Publications in Humanistic Studies. Online version at the Topos Text Project.
Grimal, Pierre, The Dictionary of Classical Mythology, Wiley-Blackwell, 1996. .
 Hasluck, F. W., Cyzicus, Cambridge University Press, 1910.
 Herodotus, Histories, A. D. Godley (translator), Cambridge, Massachusetts: Harvard University Press, 1920; . Online version at the Perseus Digital Library.
 Homer, The Iliad with an English Translation by A.T. Murray, Ph.D. in two volumes. Cambridge, MA., Harvard University Press; London, William Heinemann, Ltd. 1924. . Online version at the Perseus Digital Library.
Homer, Homeri Opera in five volumes. Oxford, Oxford University Press. 1920. . Greek text available at the Perseus Digital Library.
 Hyginus, Gaius Julius, Fabulae in Apollodorus' Library and Hyginus' Fabulae: Two Handbooks of Greek Mythology, Translated, with Introductions by R. Scott Smith and Stephen M. Trzaskoma, Hackett Publishing Company, 2007. .
 Leaf, Walter, Strabo on the Troad: Book XIII, Cap. I, Book 13, The University Press, 1923.
 Munn, Mark, The Mother of the Gods, Athens, and the Tyranny of Asia: A Study of Sovereignty in Ancient Religion, University of California Press, 2006. .
 Ovid, Heroides in Heroides. Amores. Translated by Grant Showerman. Revised by G. P. Goold. Loeb Classical Library No. 41. Cambridge, Massachusetts: Harvard University Press, 1977. . Online version at Harvard University Press.
 The Oxford Classical Dictionary, second edition, Hammond, N.G.L. and Howard Hayes Scullard (editors), Oxford University Press, 1992. .
 Parada, Carlos, Genealogical Guide to Greek Mythology, Jonsered, Paul Åströms Förlag, 1993. .
 Pausanias, Pausanias Description of Greece with an English Translation by W.H.S. Jones, Litt.D., and H.A. Ormerod, M.A., in 4 Volumes. Cambridge, Massachusetts, Harvard University Press; London, William Heinemann Ltd. 1918. Online version at the Perseus Digital Library.
 Smith, William, Dictionary of Greek and Roman Biography and Mythology, London (1873). Online version at the Perseus Digital Library.
 Strabo, Geography, translated by Horace Leonard Jones; Cambridge, Massachusetts: Harvard University Press; London: William Heinemann, Ltd. (1924). Online version at the Perseus Digital Library, Books 6–14.
 Tripp, Edward, Crowell's Handbook of Classical Mythology, Thomas Y. Crowell Co; First edition (June 1970). .

Achaean Leaders
Characters in Greek mythology
Mythology of Argos